The Tomanová Formation is a Late Triassic (Norian to Rhaetian) geologic formation in Poland and Slovakia. Fossil theropod tracks have been reported from the formation.

Fossil content 
The following fossils have been reported from the formation:

Ichnofossils
 Coelurosaurichnus tatricus
 Anomoepus sp.
 Grallator (Eubrontes)
 cf. Kayentapus sp.
 ?Sauropodomorpha indet.

See also 
 List of dinosaur-bearing rock formations
 List of stratigraphic units with theropod tracks

References

Bibliography 
 S. G. Lucas, H. Klein, M. G. Lockley, J. A. Spielmann, G. D. Gierlinski, A. P. Hunt, and L. H. Tanner. 2006. Triassic-Jurassic stratigraphic distribution of the theropod footprint ichnogenus Eubrontes. In J. D. Harris, S. G. Lucas, J. A. Spielmann, M. G. Lockley, A. R. C. Milner, & J. I. Kirkland (eds.), The Triassic-Jurassic Terrestrial Transition. New Mexico Museum of Natural History and Science Bulletin 37:86-93
  
 J. Michalik and M. Kundrát. 1998. Uppermost Triassic dinosaur ichno-parataxa from Slovakia. Journal of Vertebrate Paleontology 18(3, suppl.):63A

Geologic formations of Poland
Geologic formations of Slovakia
Triassic System of Europe
Norian Stage
Rhaetian Stage
Shale formations
Sandstone formations
Fluvial deposits
Ichnofossiliferous formations
Paleontology in Poland
Paleontology in Slovakia